Below are the rosters of the minor league affiliates of the Atlanta Braves:

Prospects

Dylan Dodd

Dylan Martin Dodd (born June 6, 1998) is an American professional baseball pitcher in the Atlanta Braves organization.

Dylan Dodd was born to parents Mark and Thea Dodd. Mark coached Dylan's high school baseball and football teams. Dodd attended Bismarck Henning High School in Bismarck, Illinois and played college baseball at Kankakee Community College and Southeast Missouri State. In 2021, he was named the Ohio Valley Conference Pitcher of the Year. Dodd was drafted by the Atlanta Braves in the third round of the 2021 Major League Baseball draft, and was the first athlete in his high school's history to be selected in the MLB draft. Dodd joined the Braves after agreeing to a $125,000 signing bonus. 

Dodd spent his first professional season in 2021 with the Augusta GreenJackets and Rome Braves. He started 2022 with Rome before being promoted to the Mississippi Braves and ended the year with the Gwinnett Braves. Before the 2023 regular season began, Dodd participated in spring training and competed alongside Jared Shuster for the fifth spot in the Atlanta Braves' starting rotation.

Jesse Franklin V

Jesse Owen Franklin V (born December 1, 1998) is an American professional baseball outfielder in the Atlanta Braves organization.

Franklin attended Seattle Preparatory School in Seattle, Washington. As a sophomore in 2015, he hit .532. In 2017, his senior year, he batted .571 with four home runs and was named Washington's Gatorade Baseball Player of the Year. He was selected by the Seattle Mariners in the 37th round of the 2017 Major League Baseball draft, but did not sign and instead enrolled at the University of Michigan where he played college baseball.

In 2018, Franklin's freshman year at Michigan, he appeared in 47 games in which he hit .327 with ten home runs and 47 RBIs. He was named Player of the Week once and Freshman of the Week three times throughout the season. He played in the Cape Cod Baseball League for the Brewster Whitecaps that summer. As a sophomore in 2019, he batted .262 with 13 home runs and 55 RBIs over 68 games. He returned to Brewster after the season's end. Franklin did not make an appearance during the 2020 season due to a collarbone injury and the season being cancelled due to the COVID-19 pandemic. He was selected by the Atlanta Braves in the third round with the 97th overall selection of the 2020 Major League Baseball draft. He signed for $497,500.

Franklin made his professional debut in 2021 with the Rome Braves of the High-A East, slashing .244/.320/.522 with 24 home runs, 61 RBIs, and 19 stolen bases over 101 games. His 24 home runs were most among Atlanta minor leaguers and were also tied for first place in the league. He was selected to play in the Arizona Fall League for the Peoria Javelinas after the season. He was assigned to the Mississippi Braves of the Double-A Southern League to begin the 2022 season. In early June, he underwent Tommy John surgery which forced him to miss the remainder of the season.

Greyson Jenista

Greyson Douglas Jenista (born December 7, 1996) is an American professional baseball right fielder in the Atlanta Braves organization.

Jenista attended De Soto High School in De Soto, Kansas, and Wichita State University, where he played college baseball for the Wichita State Shockers. In 2017, he played collegiate summer baseball for the Cotuit Kettleers of the Cape Cod Baseball League and was named the league's most valuable player.

The Atlanta Braves selected Jenista in the second round, with the 49th overall selection, of the 2018 MLB draft. He signed and played ten games for the Danville Braves of the Rookie-level Appalachian League, and was promoted to the Rome Braves of the Class A South Atlantic League. After 32 games in Rome, he was promoted to the Florida Fire Frogs of the Class A-Advanced Florida State League. In 61 total games between the two teams, he hit .265 with four home runs and 34 RBIs. He returned to Florida to begin 2019, and was promoted to the Mississippi Braves in June. Over 130 games between both teams, he batted .233 with nine home runs and 55 RBIs. He was selected to play in the Arizona Fall League for the Scottsdale Scorpions following the season.

Nolan Kingham

Nolan Ray Kingham (born August 18, 1996) is an American professional baseball pitcher in the Atlanta Braves organization.

Kingham grew up in Las Vegas, Nevada and initially attended Sierra Vista High School before transferring to Desert Oasis High School before his senior year. Kingham was selected in the 39th round of the 2015 Major League Baseball Draft by the Milwaukee Brewers, but opted not to sign.

Kingham played college baseball for the Texas Longhorns for three seasons. He pitched mostly in relief during his freshman season and appeared in 21 total games and finished with a 2–3 record and a 3.79 ERA. As a sophomore, Kingham was moved to the starting rotation and was named first team All-Big 12 Conference after leading the Longhorns with a 10–4 record and a 2.84 ERA.

Kingham was drafted by the Atlanta Braves in the 12th round of the 2018 Major League Baseball Draft. After signing with the team he was assigned to the Rookie League Danville Braves. Kingham began the 2019 season with the Class A Rome Braves before being promoted to the Florida Fire Frogs of the Class A-Advanced Florida State League after allowing one earned run over 16 innings pitched. After throwing three complete game shutouts with Florida, he was promoted a second time to the Double-A Mississippi Braves and had a 3.79 ERA over six starts. Kingham did not play during 2020 due to the cancellation of the minor league season because of the COVID-19 pandemic. Kingham returned to the Mississippi Braves for the start of the 2021 minor league season before being promoted to the Triple-A Gwinnett Stripers. With Gwinnett, he posted a 0–5 record and 10.13 ERA, and returned to Mississippi on August 17. Kingham then spent nearly one month on the injured list and returned to action in mid-September as Mississippi's closer.

Texas Longhorns bio

Roddery Muñoz

Roddery Muñoz (born April 14, 2000) is a Dominican professional baseball pitcher in the Atlanta Braves organization.

Muñoz signed with the Atlanta Braves as an international free agent in June 2018. He made his professional debut that year with the Dominican Summer League Braves.

The Braves added Muñoz to their 40-man roster after the 2022 season. Muñoz was optioned to the Triple-A Gwinnett Stripers to begin the 2023 season.

Jacob Pearson

Jacob Taylor Pearson (born June 1, 1998) is an American professional baseball outfielder for the Atlanta Braves organization.

Pearson attended West Monroe High School in West Monroe, Louisiana. As a senior, he batted .519 with 12 home runs. He was named the state's Gatorade Player of the Year and the most valuable player of the All-State team. Pearson committed to attend Louisiana State University (LSU) to play college baseball for the LSU Tigers.

The Los Angeles Angels selected Pearson in the third round, with the 85th overall selection, of the 2017 Major League Baseball draft. He signed with the Angels rather than attend LSU, earning a $1 million signing bonus. Pearson spent his first professional season with the Arizona League Angels where he batted .226 with 13 RBIs in 40 games.

After being told they would not sign Shohei Ohtani during the 2017–18 offseason, the Minnesota Twins traded $1 million in international signing bonus money to the Angels for Pearson on December 6, 2017. Pearson spent the 2018 season with the Cedar Rapids Kernels, hitting .237 with seven home runs and 36 RBIs in 78 games. He returned to Cedar Rapids to begin 2019 before being promoted to the Fort Myers Miracle in July. Over 117 games between the two clubs, Pearson slashed .233/.303/.338 with five home runs, 41 RBIs, and 19 stolen bases.

On December 10, 2020, Pearson was selected by the Atlanta Braves in the minor league phase of the Rule 5 Draft. Pearson was assigned to the Mississippi Braves for the 2021 season. Over 53 games, he batted .171 with four home runs and 19 RBIs.

Hudson Potts

Hudson James Potts (born Hudson Sanchez on October 28, 1998) is an American professional baseball third baseman who is currently a free agent.

Hudson Potts was known as Hudson Sanchez until 2016, when he took his stepfather's last name. He was drafted by the San Diego Padres in the first round of the 2016 Major League Baseball draft out of Carroll Senior High School. He had committed to play college baseball for the Texas A&M Aggies, but chose to sign with the Padres.

After signing, Potts spent 2016 with both the Arizona League Padres and the Tri-City Dust Devils, posting a combined .280 batting average with one home run and 27 RBIs in 59 games between both teams. He spent 2017 with the Fort Wayne TinCaps where he batted .253 with 20 home runs, 69 RBIs, and a .731 OPS in 125 games, and 2018 with the Lake Elsinore Storm (earning California League All-Star honors) and the San Antonio Missions, slashing .260/.335/.455 with 19 home runs and 63 RBIs in 128 games between the two teams. He spent 2019 with the Amarillo Sod Poodles, slashing .227/.290/.406 with 16 home runs and 59 RBIs over 107 games. Following the 2019 season, Potts played for the Peoria Javelinas of the Arizona Fall League.

On August 30, 2020, Potts and outfielder Jeisson Rosario were traded to the Boston Red Sox in exchange for Mitch Moreland. Although he did not play during 2020 due to cancellation of the minor league season, Potts was subsequently invited to participate in the Red Sox' fall instructional league. On November 20, 2020, Potts was added to the 40-man roster.  During spring training in 2021, he suffered an oblique strain. He began the minor-league season on the injured list until activated in June, joining the Double-A Portland Sea Dogs where he batted .217 with 11 home runs and 47 RBIs in 78 games.

On March 22, 2022, Potts was designated for assignment by the Red Sox, removing him from the team's 40-man roster as they added Kyle Tyler via a waiver claim. 

On December 5, 2022, Potts signed a minor league contract with the Atlanta Braves.

SoxProspects scouting report

Alan Rangel

Alan Eduardo Rangel (born August 21, 1997) is a Mexican professional baseball pitcher in the Atlanta Braves organization.

The Braves added him to their 40-man roster after the 2021 season. On November 29, 2022, Rangel resigned a minor league deal.

AJ Smith-Shawver

AJ Smith-Shawver (born November 20, 2002) is an American professional baseball pitcher in the Atlanta Braves organization.

Smith-Shawver grew up in Colleyville, Texas and attended Colleyville Heritage High School, where he played baseball and football. He was Colleyville Heritage's starting quarterback and passed for 2,616 yards and 25 touchdowns as a senior. He was named All-Area by the Dallas Morning News as a third baseman after batting .344 with 20 RBIs. Smith-Shawver committed to play both college baseball and college football at Texas Tech University.

Smith-Shawver was selected by the Atlanta Braves in the seventh round of the 2021 Major League Baseball Draft. He signed with the team and received an over-slot signing bonus of $997,500. After signing, Smith-Shawver was assigned to the Rookie-level Florida Complex League Braves and made four appearances. He spent the 2022 season with the Single-A Augusta GreenJackets.

Darius Vines

Darius Marque Vines (born April 30, 1998) is an American professional baseball pitcher in the Atlanta Braves organization.

Vines attended St. Bonaventure High School in Ventura, California. He was the Ventura County Star Player of the Year his senior year in 2016. He was drafted by the Houston Astros in the 32nd round of the 2016 Major League Baseball Draft, but did not sign and played college baseball at Oxnard College. He was then drafted by the Chicago Cubs in the 27th round of the 2017 MLB draft but again did not sign and transferred to Yavapai College. In 2019 Vines transferred to California State University, Bakersfield. After one year at Bakersfield, he was drafted by the Atlanta Braves in the seventh round of the 2019 MLB draft and signed.

Vines spent his first professional season with the Gulf Coast Braves and Danville Braves. After not playing in 2020 due to the COVID-19 pandemic cancelling the minor league season, he pitched for the Augusta GreenJackets and Rome Braves in 2021. Vines started 2022 with the Mississippi Braves. 

He was added to the 40-man roster after the 2022 season. Vines was optioned to the Triple-A Gwinnett Stripers to begin the 2023 season.

Victor Vodnik

Victor Francisco Vodnik (born October 9, 1999) is an American professional baseball pitcher in the Atlanta Braves organization.

Vodnik grew up in Rialto, California and attended Rialto High School. As a senior, he had a  5–4 record with a 2.84 ERA and 85 strikeouts in 49 innings pitched.

Vodnik was selected by the Atlanta Braves in the 14th round of the 2018 Major League Baseball draft, and joined the Braves organization for a signing bonus of $200,000. He was assigned to the Rookie League Gulf Coast League Braves after signing with the team. Vodnik spent the 2019 season with the Class A Rome Braves and made 23 appearances with three starts, compiling a 1–3 record and three saves with a 2.94 ERA and 69 strikeouts over  innings pitched. After the 2020 minor league season was canceled due to COVID-19, he was added to Atlanta's alternate training site on September 3, 2020. Vodnik was assigned to the Mississippi Braves of the Double-A South, where he made 11 starts and had a 5.35 ERA and 41 strikeouts in  innings pitched while missing time due to injury. After the minor league season ended Vodnik joined the Peoria Javelinas of the Arizona Fall League. After pitching for Mississippi in May 2022, Vodnik was promoted to the Gwinnett Braves later that month.

Luke Waddell

Luke Thomas Waddell (born July 13, 1998) is an American professional baseball shortstop in the Atlanta Braves organization.

Waddell was born in Loveland, Ohio, on July 13, 1998, to parents Eric and Lisa. His older brother is Reid. Luke Waddell attended Loveland High School. He set several school records in baseball and American football, and as a high school freshman in 2013, was a member of the Loveland Tigers team that won Ohio's Division II state championship in football against Glenville High School, which featured future National Football League player Marshon Lattimore. While a high school student, Waddell also played on the Midland Redskins travel baseball team for three years. In 2017, his final year with the team, Waddell won a Connie Mack World Series championship. After graduating from high school in 2017, Waddell joined the Georgia Tech Yellow Jackets baseball team. Following the 2018 NCAA Division I baseball season, he played for the Yarmouth–Dennis Red Sox of the Cape Cod Baseball League. His 2019 season with Yarmouth–Dennis was cut short by his selection to the USA Baseball collegiate national team, which played in Japan and Taiwan. Waddell was named Georgia Tech's first solo captain since 1991 during the 2020 NCAA Division I baseball season, which was cancelled due to the COVID-19 pandemic. During the 2021 Georgia Tech Yellow Jackets baseball season, Waddell was honored with an All-Atlantic Coast Conference first team selection.

Waddell was selected by the Arizona Diamondbacks in 32nd round of the 2019 Major League Baseball draft, but returned to Georgia Tech. He was eligible for, but not chosen in the 2020 draft, and instead focused on completing his bachelor's degree in business administration. He was subsequently selected by the Atlanta Braves in the fifth round of the 2021 draft, and accepted a signing bonus of $247,500, which was approximately $85,000 under slot. Waddell was assigned to the Rome Braves, where he played 21 games, hitting .304/.372/.580. In September 2021, Waddell was promoted to the Mississippi Braves, and became the first Braves' draft pick of the 2021 class to reach the Double-A level. After the 2021 Double-A South season ended, the Braves sent Waddell to the Arizona Fall League, where he played for the Peoria Javelinas. Waddell began the 2022 season with the Mississippi Braves. Waddell was invited to spring training before the 2023 season. In March, he was assigned to minor league camp.

Full Triple-A to Rookie League rosters

Triple-A

Double-A

High-A

Single-A

Rookie

Foreign Rookie

References

Minor League Players
Lists of minor league baseball players
Year of birth missing (living people)